Maria Makowska (born 25 January 1969) is a retired Polish football player.

Makowska began her career playing club football for Pafawag Wrocław and Stilon Gorzów in the Polish Women's Ekstraliga. She moved to Germany where she enjoyed success with 1. FFC Turbine Potsdam, winning the Fußball-Bundesliga 2003–04, DFB-Pokal 2003–04 and DFB-Hallenpokal 2004.

Makowska made over 100 appearances for the Poland women's national football team, including 16 FIFA Women's World Cup qualifying matches.

References

External links
Profile at PostSV-FrauenFussball.de

1969 births
Living people
Polish women's footballers
Polish expatriate sportspeople in Germany
1. FFC Turbine Potsdam players
Expatriate women's footballers in Germany
FIFA Century Club
Place of birth missing (living people)
Poland women's international footballers
Women's association football midfielders
ŽNK Krka players
Expatriate women's footballers in Slovenia